Julie Wendel Lundholdt (born 20 November 1983) is a former Danish snowboarder from Copenhagen, Denmark. Julie Lundholdt is currently not ranked and has paused her professional snowboard carrier.

2010 Olympics
Lundholdt failed to progress from the quarterfinal round of Snowboard Cross at the 2010 Winter Olympics in Vancouver, British Columbia. Canada's Maëlle Ricker went on to win the gold medal for the host country.

References 

1983 births
Living people
Olympic snowboarders of Denmark
Danish female snowboarders
Snowboarders at the 2010 Winter Olympics
Sportspeople from Copenhagen